S. F. Said (born 1967) is a British children's writer.

His first novel was Varjak Paw (2003), illustrated by Dave McKean and published by David Fickling Books in January 2003; four months later in the U.S., Varjak Paw won the 2003 Nestlé Smarties Book Prize. The sequel, The Outlaw Varjak Paw (2005), won the 2007 Blue Peter Book of the Year. Phoenix (2013) is a longer novel written for older children. It was shortlisted for the Guardian Children's Fiction Prize and was selected to represent the U.K. on the IBBY Honour List for 2016.

Biography 
S. F. Said is a British Muslim author of Middle Eastern background, who was born in Beirut and spent his first years in Jordan. He describes his origins as "Iraqi, Egyptian, Kurdish, and Circassian." He grew up in London, moving there with his mother at the age of two. After graduating from the University of Cambridge, he worked as a press attaché and speech writer for the Crown Prince of Jordan's office in London for six years. He began a Ph.D. in 1997 looking at the lives of young Muslims in Britain, but left academia to focus on film journalism for The Daily Telegraph – where he brought attention to much so-called world cinema, including contemporary Islamic cinema – and on writing for children. Said has also written a number of articles and reviews for The Guardian about children's books.

Writing career 
S. F. Said has published three novels for children thus far. Varjak Paw tells the story of a Mesopotamian Blue cat called Varjak who leaves his sheltered upbringing to explore the city and learn the "Seven Skills of the Way", taught to him in dreams by his ancestor Jalal. In his dreams, Varjak finds himself transported from his gritty urban surroundings to the deserts, rivers and mountains of Mesopotamia (ancient Iraq). With the Skills, he is able to fight the Gentleman. Varjak was staged as a play by Playbox Theatre, and was performed as an opera by The Opera Group in 2008. Said wrote 17 drafts of the book.

In the sequel, The Outlaw Varjak Paw (2005), the domineering "white cat with one eye", Sally Bones, invades the territories of other cats and ruling them with torture and terror, and Varjak leads the other cats – and some dogs – in the fight against her. In 2020, Blue Peter asked the audience to vote for their all-time favourite Blue Peter Book Award-winner, and The Outlaw Varjak Paw was included in the top ten.

Phoenix is not a Varjak-world novel. The Internet Speculative Fiction Database calls it young-adult science fiction rather than (animal) fantasy. It made the shortlist of four books for the 2014 Guardian Children's Fiction Prize, whose judges recommended it for ages 10 and up, and whose coverage by The Guardian called it a "space epic".

Said has contributed an essay to The Gifts of Reading (2020), an anthology inspired by Robert Macfarlane's essay of the same name. He also contributed a story to The Book of Hopes (2020), edited by Katherine Rundell, an anthology for young readers that raised money for NHS charities during the COVID-19 pandemic in the U.K.

Additionally, Said has judged a number of major U.K. book prizes, including the Costa Book Awards, the Guardian Children Fiction Prize, the inaugural Amnesty/CILIP Honour, and the BookTrust Lifetime Achievement Award.

Books 
 Varjak Paw, illustrated by Dave McKean (David Fickling Books, 2003)
 The Outlaw Varjak Paw, illus. Dave McKean (David Fickling, 2005)
 Phoenix, illus. Dave McKean (David Fickling, 2013), 489 pp.,

Awards
 Nestlé Smarties Book Prize (2003) – Varjak Paw
 Blue Peter Book Award, Book of the Year (2007) – The Outlaw Varjak Paw
 IBBY Honour List (2016) – Phoenix

References

External links
 Official website: www.sfsaid.com
 
 Guardian children's fiction prize book club: Phoenix by SF Said (July 2014)
 

1967 births
British children's writers
British fantasy writers
British science fiction writers
Living people
Muslim writers
British Muslims
Writers from Beirut